Ategumia crocealis is a moth in the family Crambidae. It was described by Paul Dognin in 1906. It is found in Ecuador.

References

Moths described in 1906
Spilomelinae
Moths of South America